The 1999 Algarve Cup was the sixth edition of the Algarve Cup, an invitational women's association football tournament. It took place between 14 and 20 March 1999 in Portugal with China winning the event defeating the US, 2-1, in the final game. The Chinese triumph also became China's first victory
against the USA since 1993.

Format 
The host and the seven teams invited are
Australia,
China,
Denmark,
Finland,
Norway,
Portugal,
Sweden and the
United States.

The eight teams were split into two groups that played a round-robin group stage. On completion of this, the fourth
placed teams from each group would playoff to determine seventh and eighth place, the third placed teams from each group would play each other to decide fifth and sixth place, the second placed teams in each group would play to determine third and fourth place and the winners of the groups would compete for first and second place.

Points awarded in the group stage are three points for a win, one point for a draw and none for a loss.

Group A

Group B

Seventh place 

Portugal finished bottom of their group for the sixth year in a row but won the seventh place playoff with a 2–1 win against Finland.

Fifth place

Third place

Final

Final standings

Goal scorers

References

External links 
 1999 Algarve Cup on RSSSF

1999
1999 in women's association football
1998–99 in Portuguese football
1999 in Chinese football
1999 in American women's soccer
1999 in Norwegian women's football
1998–99 in Danish women's football
1998–99 in Australian women's soccer
1999 in Swedish women's football
1999 in Finnish football
March 1999 sports events in Europe
1999 in Portuguese women's sport